The 2022–23 Coupe de France preliminary rounds, Paris-Île-de-France is the qualifying competition to decide which teams from the leagues of the Paris-Île-de-France region of France take part in the main competition from the seventh round.

A total of ten teams will progress from the Paris-Île-de-France preliminary rounds.

In 2021–22, Championnat National 2 side FC Versailles 78 progressed to the semi-final, eliminating Ligue 2 side Toulouse FC in the round of 16 via a 1–0 win, and Bergerac Périgord FC in a penalty shoot-out in the quarter-final. Versailles was eventually defeated 2–0 by Nice in the semi-finals.

Draws and fixtures
On 19 April 2022, the league announced that a total of 485 teams from the region had registered for the competition, and that they would be holding the first two preliminary rounds before the end of the 2021–22 season. The first round would take place on the weekend of 22 May 2022, featuring 368 teams from the district level divisions. 93 teams from the régional level divisions would enter at the second round stage, on 12 June 2022. It was expected that a Tour de Cadrage (framing, or intermediate round) would be required at the end of August in order to have the correct number of teams in the third round.

The details of the Tour de Cadrage were published on 23 August 2022, with 14 matches featuring teams which had qualified from the second round.

The third round draw was published on 30 August 2022, with the 12 teams from Championnat National 3 entering. The fourth round draw, which saw the 6 teams from Championnat National 2 enter the competition, was published on 13 September 2022.

The fifth round draw, which saw the three teams from the region that compete in Championnat National enter the competition, was published on 29 September 2022. The sixth round draw was published on 10 October 2022.

First round
These matches were played on 22 May 2022, with two replayed on, or rescheduled for 12 June 2022. Tiers relate to the 2021–22 season.

Second round
These matches were played on 8, 9, 12, 17 and 19 June 2022, with one replayed on 28 August 2022. Tiers relate to the 2021–22 season.

Intermediate round
These matches were played on 28 August and 4 September 2022

Third round
These matches were played on 10, 11 and 18 September 2022

Fourth round
These matches were played on 24 and 25 September 2022

Fifth round
These matches were played on 8 and 9 October 2022

Sixth round
These matches were played on 15 and 16 October 2022

References

Preliminary rounds